Hypromellose (INN), short for hydroxypropyl methylcellulose (HPMC), is a semisynthetic, inert, viscoelastic polymer used in eye drops, as well as an excipient and controlled-delivery component in oral medicaments, found in a variety of commercial products.

As a food additive, hypromellose is an emulsifier, thickening and suspending agent, and an alternative to animal gelatin. Its Codex Alimentarius code (E number) is E464.

Chemistry

Hypromellose is a solid, and is a slightly off-white to beige powder in appearance and may be formed into granules. The compound forms colloids when dissolved in water. This non-toxic ingredient is combustible and can react vigorously with oxidizing agents.

Hypromellose in an aqueous solution, like methylcellulose, exhibits a thermal gelation property. That is, when the solution heats up to a critical temperature, the solution congeals into a non-flowable but semi-flexible mass. Typically, this critical (congealing) temperature is inversely related to both the solution concentration of HPMC and the concentration of the methoxy group within the HPMC molecule (which in turn depends on both the degree of substitution of the methoxy group and the molar substitution). That is, the higher the concentration of the methoxy group, the lower the critical temperature. The inflexibility/viscosity of the resulting mass, however, is directly related to the concentration of the methoxy group (the higher the concentration is, the more viscous or less flexible the resulting mass is).

Uses 
There are many fields of application for hypromellose, including:

 Tile adhesives
 Cement renders
 Gypsum products
 Pharmaceutical
 Paints and coatings
 Food
 Cosmetics
 Detergents and cleaners
 Eye drops
 Contact lenses
 Polyvinyl Chloride (PVC)

Use in whole grain breads
Agricultural Research Service scientists are investigating using the plant-derived HPMC as a substitute for gluten in making all-oat and other grain breads.  Gluten, which is present in wheat, rye, and barley, is absent (or present only in trace quantities) in oat and other grains. Like gluten, HPMC can trap air bubbles formed by the yeast in bread dough, causing the bread to rise.

Use in construction materials
HPMC is used primarily in construction materials like tile adhesives and renders where it is used as a rheology modifier and water retention agent.

Functionally HPMC is very similar to HEMC (hydroxy ethyl methyl cellulose) Trade names include Methocel and Walocel. The global leading producer is now DuPont, formerly manufactured under Dow Wolff Cellulosics GmbH.

Ophthalmic applications
Hypromellose solutions were patented as a semisynthetic substitute for tear-film. Its molecular structure is predicated upon a base celluloid compound that is highly water-soluble. Post-application, celluloid attributes of good water solubility reportedly aid in visual clarity. When applied, a hypromellose solution acts to swell and absorb water, thereby expanding the thickness of the tear-film. Hypromellose augmentation therefore results in extended lubricant time presence on the cornea, which theoretically results in decreased eye irritation, especially in dry climates, home, or work environments. On a molecular level, this polymer contains beta-linked D-glucose units that remain metabolically intact for days to weeks. On a manufacturing note, since hypromellose is a vegetarian substitute for gelatin, it is slightly more expensive to produce due to semisynthetic manufacturing processes. Aside from its widespread commercial and retail availability over the counter in a variety of products, hypromellose 2% solution has been documented to be used during surgery to aid in corneal protection and during orbital surgery.

Excipient/tableting ingredient
In addition to its use in ophthalmic liquids, hypromellose has been used as an excipient in oral tablet and capsule formulations, where, depending on the grade, it functions as controlled release agent to delay the release of a medicinal compound into the digestive tract.
It is also used as a binder and as a component of tablet coatings.

Test methods
Various benchmark tests are used to qualify hypromellose:
 Viscosity
 Degree of substitution (DS)
 Molar substitution (MS)
 Salt content
 Moisture

Viscosity test methods
Because hypromellose solution is a non-newtonian solution and exhibits pseudoplastic, more specifically, thixotropic behavior, various test methods are available, and the results of different methods and viscosimeters do not necessarily correspond to each other.  Also, due to viscometer acceptable ranges of error, viscosity is typically given as a mean, or as a range.  Typical viscosity test will specify the following:

Solution concentration (1%, 2%, 1.9% bone dry, etc.)
Viscometer (RheoSense m-VROC and microVISC, Brookfield LV or RV, Höppler falling ball, Haake Rotovisco, etc.)
Viscometer spindle number (1 ~ 4 for Brookfield LV, 1 ~ 7 for Brookfield RV, etc.)
Solution Temperature (20 °C, 25 °C, etc.)

Degree of substitution
Degree of substitution is the average level of methoxy substitution on the cellulose chain.  Since there are maximum three possible sites of substitution with each cellulose molecule, this average value is a real number between 0 and 3.  However, degree of substitution is often expressed in percentages.

Molar substitution
Molar substitution is the average level of hydroxypropoxy substitution on the cellulose chain.  Since hydroxypropoxy base can be attached to each other on side chains and does not each require a base substitution site on the cellulose molecule, this number can be higher than 3.  However, molar substitution is also often expressed in percentages.

Moisture
Since all cellulose ethers are hygroscopic, they will absorb moisture from surroundings if left exposed from original packaging.  Thus, moisture must be tested and weight corrected to ensure adequate amount of dry active material are apportioned for usage.  Moisture is tested by weighing a sample of X grams on an analytic scale, and drying the sample in an oven at 105 °C for 2 hours, then weighing the sample again on the same scale.

See also
 Hydroxypropyl cellulose
 Methyl cellulose

References

External links
Methylcellulose & Hydroxypropyl Methyl Cellulose for building materials

Polysaccharides
Edible thickening agents
Cellulose
Excipients
Cellulose ethers
E-number additives